Fritz Johann Heinrich Krenkow (1872–1953) was a German orientalist. He was the uncle of D. H. Lawrence.

Born in Germany, Krenkow moved to England aged 12. He earned a living with a hosiery firm in Leicester, and later acquired a reputation as an Arabic scholar. He later became a professor at the Aligarh Muslim University during 1929-30, and then at University of Bonn 1931-35.

References

1872 births
1963 deaths
Krenkow, Fritz Johann Heinrich
Academic staff of the University of Bonn
Academic staff of Aligarh Muslim University
German male non-fiction writers